The Mentor is an Australian reality television series that first screened on the Seven Network on 23 April 2018. It features Mark Bouris, the founder and chairman of Wizard Home Loans and Yellow Brick Road, who helps struggling small businesses transform into genuine successes.

The series was announced at Seven's upfronts in October 2017. Applications for the series opened in November 2017 and closed on 15 December 2017.

Ratings

References

Australia
Seven Network original programming
2010s Australian reality television series
2018 Australian television series debuts
2018 Australian television series endings
English-language television shows